Schnersheim is a commune in the Bas-Rhin department in Grand Est in north-eastern France.

On 1 May 1972, Schnersheim merged with the associated communes of Avenheim and Kleinfrankenheim.

See also
 Communes of the Bas-Rhin department
 Kochersberg

References

Communes of Bas-Rhin